May Irwin (born Georgina May Campbell; June 27, 1862 – October 22, 1938) was an actress, singer and star of vaudeville. Originally from Canada, she and her sister Flo Irwin found theater work after their father died. She was known for her performances as a coon shouter and recordings.

Early life and career
Born on June 27, 1862, in Whitby, Ontario, as Georgina May Campbell, her father, Robert E. Campbell, died when she was 13 years old; her stage-minded mother, Sophoria Jane Draper, in need of money, encouraged May and her older sister Adeline Flora ("Flo" or "Addie") to perform. They created a singing act, billed as the "Irwin Sisters," that debuted at the Adelphi Theatre in nearby Buffalo, New York in December 1874. By late 1877, their careers had progressed and they were booked to appear at New York's Metropolitan Theater, then at the Tony Pastor Theatre, a popular New York City music hall.

The sisters proved popular enough to earn regular spots for the ensuing six years, after which 21-year-old May set out on her own. She joined Augustin Daly's stock company from 1883 to 1887, where she made her first appearance on the theatrical stage. This comedian was known for her improvisation skills. An immediate success, she went on to make her London stage debut at Toole's Theatre in August 1884. By the age of 25, she was earning $2,500 a week. In 1886, her husband of eight years, Frederick W. Keller, died unexpectedly. Her sister Flora married New York State Senator Thomas F. Grady.

By the early 1890s, Irwin had married a second time and developed her career into that of a leading vaudeville performer with an act known at the time as "Coon Shouting", in which she performed African American-influenced songs. In the 1895 Broadway show The Widow Jones, she introduced "The Bully Song", which became her signature number. The performance also featured a lingering kiss, which was seen by Thomas Edison, who hired Irwin and her co-star John C. Rice to repeat the scene on film. In 1896, Edison's Kinetoscope production, The Kiss, became the first screen kiss in cinematic history.

Her own pieces included " The Widow Jones", " The Swell Miss Fitzswell", "Courted Into Court", "Kate Kip-Buyer", and "Sister Mary".
[[File:All coons look alike to me (NYPL Hades-1929688-1990770).jpg|thumb|The cover of sheet music featuring one of Irwin's songs originally performed in the Broadway musical Courted Into Court.]]

In addition to her performing and singing, Irwin also wrote the lyrics to several songs, including "Hot Tamale Alley", with music written by George M. Cohan. In 1907 she married her manager, Kurt Eisfeldt, and began making records for Berliner/Victor. Several of these recordings survive and give a notion of the actress's appeal.

Irwin's buxom figure was much in vogue at the time and, combined with her charming personality,  made her one of America's most beloved performers for more than thirty years. In 1914, she made her second silent film appearance, this time in the feature-length adaptation of George V. Hobart's play, Mrs. Black is Back, produced by Adolph Zukor's Famous Players Film Company and filmed for the most part at her own sprawling home in New York. Still pictures showing May survive from this movie.

A highly paid performer, Irwin was a shrewd investor and became a very wealthy woman.  She spent a great deal of time at a summer home on secluded Club Island, a small island off of Grindstone Island of the Thousand Islands, and at her winter home on Merritt Island, Florida, before retiring to a farm near Clayton, New York, where a street would eventually be named in her honor.

Irwin retired in 1925.

Personal life
May Irwin was married twice. Her first marriage was to Frederick W. Keller, of St. Louis, from 1878 until his death in 1886. From 1907 to the end of her life, she was married to Kurt Eisfeldt. The couple lived at West 44th Street, New York.

Irwin had two sons by her first marriage, Walter Keller (born ca. 1879 - when she was 17) and Harry Keller (b. 1882 - when she was 20).

Death
May Irwin died in New York City on October 22, 1938, aged 76. She is interred at Kensico Cemetery in Valhalla, NY.

FilmographyThe KissMrs. Black Is Back''

References

Works cited

Further reading

External links

 
 
 May Irwin and Flo Irwin at Whitby Public Library and Archives Digital Collection
 May Irwin photo gallery at NYP Library
 May Irwin Collected Works of May Irwin recordings

Canadian women singers
Canadian silent film actresses
Canadian stage actresses
Musicians from Ontario
People from Brevard County, Florida
Actresses from New York City
People from Jefferson County, New York
People from Whitby, Ontario
Vaudeville performers
1862 births
1938 deaths
Burials at Kensico Cemetery
Canadian emigrants to the United States
People from Clayton, New York